Jean-Claude Cloët (born 11 July 1951) is a retired French football defender and later manager.

He was a part of the France B team that finished runners-up at the 1975 Mediterranean Games.

References

1951 births
Living people
French footballers
Valenciennes FC players
AS Nancy Lorraine players
AS Cannes players
CO Saint-Dizier players
Association football defenders
Ligue 1 players
French football managers
Stade de Reims managers
Competitors at the 1975 Mediterranean Games
Mediterranean Games competitors for France